Patrick Owen "Pat" Gottschalk (born April 22, 1953) is an American attorney. A partner at Williams Mullen, he previously served as Virginia Secretary of Commerce under Governor Tim Kaine.

References

Living people
State cabinet secretaries of Virginia
United States Naval Academy alumni
University of Virginia School of Law alumni
1953 births